The Serayu River is a river in Central Java, Indonesia, about 300 km southeast of the capital Jakarta.

Hydrology
The river spanned from northeast to southwest with length around 181 km, and crossring five kabupaten (regency) in Central Java; they are Wonosobo Regency, Banjarnegara Regency, Purbalingga Regency, Banyumas Regency, draining to Indian Ocean with estuarine located at Cilacap Regency.

Geography
The river flows in the southern central area of Java with predominantly tropical monsoon climate (designated as Am in the Köppen-Geiger climate classification). The annual average temperature in the area is 24 °C. The warmest month is March, when the average temperature is around 25 °C, and the coldest is August, at 23 °C. The average annual rainfall is 3897 mm. The wettest month is January, with an average of 561 mm rainfall, and the driest is September, with 34 mm rainfall.

Uses
Mrica Dam is a hydroelectric powerplant dam installed in the Serayu River.

Water rafting is one of the tourist attraction in the villages of Tunggara and Prigi, in Banjarnegara Regency.

Gallery

See also
Sarayu River, in India, Sarayu and Serayu have been named after river in Hindu epic Ramayana
Sunda Kingdom, Hindu kingdom of Central and Western Java through which this river flowed
List of rivers of Indonesia
List of rivers of Java

References

Rivers of Central Java
Rivers of Indonesia